The Volga undermouth or Volga nase  (Chondrostoma variabile) is a species of cyprinid freshwater fish. This one lives in the Emba, Ural and Volga drainages of the Caspian Sea basin, and the Don River drainage of the Black Sea basin.

It is a riverine fish but is also found in reservoirs. The distribution is in lowland areas and foothills, and the fish prefer river stretches with strong currents, including rapids.  Larvae and juveniles have a superior mouth, but at 3–4 months they  change to adult feeding mode (undermouth) and start grazing the bottom, eating benthic diatoms and detritus from hard substrate. Breeding females deposit sticky eggs on gravel bottom in shallow parts of rivers with  moderate to strong current.

References 

 
 

Chondrostoma
Fish described in 1870
Taxa named by Vasily Evgrafovich Yakovlev